The Cheerful Squadron is a 1954 Italian-French historical war comedy film directed by Paolo Moffa and starring Vittorio De Sica, Daniel Gélin, Alberto Sordi and Silvana Pampanini. It is the third adaptation of a story by Georges Courteline about life in the French military in the late nineteenth century.

The film's sets were designed by the art director Gianni Polidori.

Cast 
Vittorio De Sica as the General 
Daniel Gélin as  Frédéric d'Héricourt
Paolo Stoppa as Maresciallo Flik
Alberto Sordi as Vergisson
Silvana Pampanini as Albertina 
Charles Vanel as Hurluret
Luigi Pavese as Capitano medico
Riccardo Fellini as Bonaparte
Memmo Carotenuto as Sergente maggiore
Peter Trent as Lt. Moussent
Giacomo Furia as Caporale
Jean Richard as Laperrine
Oreste Lionello

See also
The Gaieties of the Squadron (1913)
Fun in the Barracks (1932)

References

External links

1954 films
1950s war comedy films
Italian war comedy films
French war comedy films
Remakes of French films
Italian remakes of French films
Films directed by Paolo Moffa
Films set in the 1880s
Military humor in film
1954 comedy films
Films with screenplays by Michel Audiard
1950s French films
1950s Italian films